In psychology, an idée fixe is a preoccupation of mind believed to be firmly resistant to any attempt to modify it, a fixation. The name originates from the French idée , "idea" and fixe , "fixed."

Background
The initial introduction of the term idée fixe, according to intellectual historian Jan E. Goldstein, was as a medical term around 1812 in connection with monomania. As originally employed in the nineteenth and early twentieth centuries, idée fixe was "a single pathology of the intellect", distinct from monomania, a broader term that included idée fixe, but also a wider range of pathologies that did not stem from "a single compelling idea or from an emotional excess". A second difference is that the victim of idée fixe was understood to be unaware of the unreality of their frame of mind, while the victim of monomania might be aware. At that time, idée fixe was discussed as a form of neurosis or monomania.

The idea of monomania was developed by Jean-Étienne Dominique Esquirol as a diagnostic category in his work Des Malades Mentales (1839) and related to the idée fixe by Wilhelm Griesinger (1845) who viewed "every single idée fixe [as] the expression of a deeply deranged psychic individuality and probably an indicator of an incipient form of mania".

The "pathologicalization" of political convictions was used to discredit political anarchists.  The further historical evolution of idée fixe was much entangled with the introduction of psychologists into legal matters such as the insanity defense, and is found in a number of texts.

Development of the concept
The concept of idées fixes has been expanded and refined by Emil Kraepelin (1904), Carl Wernicke (1906), and Karl Jaspers (1963), evolving into a concept of overvalued ideas. An overvalued idea is a false or exaggerated and sustained belief that is maintained with much less than delusional intensity (i.e., the individual is able to acknowledge the possibility that the ideas may not be true).

Modern usage
In most contexts, idée fixe refers to an obsession or a passion one fixates on. However, the term also has a pathological dimension, denoting serious psychological issues. The pathology is what is denoted in psychology and law.

Idée fixe began as a parent category of obsession, and as a preoccupation of mind the idée fixe resembles today's obsessive-compulsive disorder. Although the afflicted person can think, reason and act like other people, they are unable to stop a particular train of thought or action. However, in obsessive-compulsive disorder, the person recognizes the absurdity of their obsession or compulsion, which may not be the case with an idée fixe(normally being a delusion). Today, the term idée fixe does not denote a specific disorder in psychology, and does not appear as a technical designation in the Diagnostic and Statistical Manual of Mental Disorders (DSM). It is still used as a descriptive term, appearing in dictionaries of psychology.

In literature
An example of an idée fixe is in Cervantes's  Don Quixote:

Although Melville's Captain Ahab may come to mind as another famous example of idée fixe, and it is sometimes referred to this way, more often Ahab's obsession is referred to as monomania (the more inclusive term), and Melville himself does that. It would seem from the description of Ahab's possession that idée fixe applies quite accurately, as the following description suggests:

However, what makes monomania the better term is that "Captain Ahab ... has an inkling of his true state of mind: 'my means are sane, my motive and my object mad.

The words idée fixe also occur explicitly: for example, in Arthur Conan Doyle's Sherlock Holmes:

and in Abraham B. Yehoshua's novel about the  Mani family through six generations:

and in the account of the war on terror by George Bush's counter-terrorism chief Richard A. Clarke:

Legal implications
Possibly the best example of the role of idée fixe in an insanity defense today is its use in identifying paranoid personality disorder.

See also

References

Further reading

External links
 

Delusional disorders
History of psychology
Obsessive–compulsive disorder
Paranoia
Psychological concepts
Psychosis